Jeremy Ferdman (born November 10, 1986) is a Canadian actor.

Biography
First seen in the Toronto production of "Flora, the Red Menace", Jeremy Ferdman started his acting career on stage. He has performed in theatres across North America including Theatre Calgary, the John F. Kennedy Centre and The Winter Garden Theatre. After living in Atlanta where he worked at Georgia Shakespeare Festival touring with: A Midsummer Night's Dream, 'Will's World' (about the life of the famous playwright), and 'Metamorphoses', he moved to Los Angeles.

He has worked on a numerous television series including NBC's Angela's Eyes, the FXX series "Man Seeking Woman", Lifetime's Killer Kids, ABC's "Home for the Holidays", CW's "Burden of Truth" and Syfy's Warehouse 13.

Ferdman played the zany Poster Guy in Horrorween directed by Joe Estevez and acted alongside William Shatner. He can be seen in Dominion, a Dylan Thomas biopic starring Rhys Ifans, Tony Hale and John Malkovitch, for which he was also the executive producer. In 2016, Jeremy played the role of Marty Glickman in Race, a Jesse Owens biopic starring Stephan James, Jeremy Irons, Jason Sudeikis and William Hurt. In 2017, he starred in the critically acclaimed Robbery, which earned him a nomination for Outstanding Performance at the 2019 ACTRA Awards in Toronto.

Ferdman is a graduate of the Stella Adler Studio of Acting in New York City.

Filmography

References

External links

Canadian Newspaper
Horrorween
Backstage
Twitter
Roger Ebert

1986 births
Living people
Canadian male film actors
Jewish Canadian male actors
Male actors from Toronto